Copiah County is a county located in the U.S. state of Mississippi. As of the 2020 census, the population was 28,368. The county seat is Hazlehurst.

With an eastern border formed by the Pearl River, Copiah County is part of the Jackson, MS Metropolitan Statistical Area.

History
Copiah, from a Choctaw Indian word meaning calling panther, was organized in 1823 as Mississippi's 18th county. In the year of county organization, Walter Leake served as governor and James Monroe as President of the United States. In 2004 Calling Panther Lake, commemorating this name, was opened up just West and North of Crystal Springs near the Jack and New Zion community.

Soon after the Choctaw Indians relinquished their claims to this land in 1819 and the legislature formed Copiah County in 1823, Elisha Lott, a Methodist minister who had worked among the Indians, brought his family from Hancock County to a location near the present site of Crystal Springs.  When the New Orleans, Jackson and Great Northern Railroad built in the area in 1858, a new town was created about a mile and a half west of the old settlement.  The new settlement took the name Crystal Springs and the old settlement became Old Crystal Springs.

William J. Willing's home was the first to be built in the new town, and Jefferson Davis, president of the Confederacy, once made a speech from the front yard.  Ozious Osborne owned the first merchandise store on a corner of his residence lot on south Jackson Street.  This lot later became the Merchants Grocery Company's site.

The first church built was the Methodist in 1860 in Hazelhurst. It was followed by the Baptist in 1861, Presbyterian in 1870. Trinity Episcopal was built in 1882, during a growth in the US Episcopal Church. After the American Civil War, most freedmen withdrew from white churches to establish their own independent congregations, setting up state associations of Baptists by the end of the nineteenth century.

The county expanded its production of commercial vegetable crops, known as truck farming, in the 19th and 20th centuries. Crystal Springs developed as one of the largest tomato shipping centers. Its commercial farming started in 1870 when the first shipment of peaches, grown by James Sturgis, was shipped to New Orleans and Chicago markets. Tomatoes were still known as "love apples" when N. Piazza imported seeds from Italy, and with help from S. H. Stackhouse, began scientific cultivation of tomato plants.  With the help of German immigrant Augustus Lotterhos, the industry achieved success.  In 1878, Lotterhos pooled the products of a number of tomato growers and shipped the first boxcar load to Denver, Colorado.

In the 1960s, Hazlehurst and Crystal Springs were centers of civil rights activism in the southwest part of the state. In addition to working with the Freedom Democratic Party in 1964 on voter registration and education, they organized to make progress after passage of federal civil rights legislation in 1964 and 1965. With the aid  of Deacons for Defense and Justice, to protect protesters working with the NAACP on boycotts of merchants in 1966 and 1967 in order to gain integration of public facilities and implement civil rights legislation. The Deacons for Defense had first been organized in Natchez in 1965 to protect African-American protesters, after considerable earlier violence in the state against protesters.

Geography

Major highways
  Interstate 55
  U.S. Highway 51
  Mississippi Highway 18
  Mississippi Highway 27
  Mississippi Highway 28
  Mississippi Highway 844

Adjacent counties
 Hinds County (north)
 Simpson County (east)
 Lawrence County (southeast)
 Lincoln County (south)
 Jefferson County (southwest)
 Claiborne County (west)

National protected area
 Homochitto National Forest (part)

Demographics
The mostly rural county has had two periods of marked losses of population during waves of the Great Migration of African Americans out of the rural South: from 1910 to 1920, and from 1940 to 1970. In the first period, most migrants went North, many to St. Louis or Chicago. In the second, they went West, particularly to California where the defense industry had many new jobs and federal policy created opportunities for African Americans in these fields.

2020 census

As of the 2020 United States census, there were 28,368 people, 9,414 households, and 6,609 families residing in the county.

2010 census
As of the 2010 United States Census, there were 29,449 people living in the county. 50.9% were Black or African American, 46.3% White, 0.3% Asian, 0.2% Native American, 1.6% of some other race and 0.8% of two or more races. 2.6% were Hispanic or Latino (of any race).

2000 census
As of the census of 2000, there were 28,757 people, 10,142 households, and 7,494 families living in the county. The population density was 37 people per square mile (14/km2).  There were 11,101 housing units at an average density of 14 per square mile (6/km2). The racial makeup of the county was 50.95% Black or African American, 47.80% White, 0.07% Native American, 0.16% Asian, 0.01% Pacific Islander, 0.46% from other races, and 0.54% from two or more races. 1.15% of the population were Hispanic or Latino of any race.

There were 10,142 households, out of which 34.40% had children under the age of 18 living with them, 48.70% were married couples living together, 20.10% had a female householder with no husband present, and 26.10% were non-families. 23.60% of all households were made up of individuals, and 10.30% had someone living alone who was 65 years of age or older.  The average household size was 2.71 and the average family size was 3.20.

In the county, the population was spread out, with 26.90% under the age of 18, 12.50% from 18 to 24, 26.80% from 25 to 44, 21.10% from 45 to 64, and 12.70% who were 65 years of age or older.  The median age was 34 years. For every 100 females, there were 92.90 males. For every 100 females age 18 and over, there were 89.10 males.

The median income for a household in the county was $26,358, and the median income for a family was $31,079. Males had a median income of $28,763 versus $20,104 for females. The per capita income for the county was $12,408. About 22.00% of families and 25.10% of the population were below the poverty line, including 33.20% of those under age 18 and 21.20% of those age 65 or over.

Tomato Festival
The county is known as a tomato and cabbage producing area, and for many years was called the "Tomato Capital of the World." Specifically, Crystal Springs was known as "The Tomato Capital of the World" because for a few years in the late 1930s it canned and shipped out via rail car more tomatoes than any other locale. Its predominance was disrupted by the onset of World War II but it kept the title.

In June 2000, the town revived celebration of an annual Tomato Festival, held on the last Saturday in June. It includes a tomato growing contest (with prizes for largest tomato, ugliest tomato, prettiest tomato, etc.), tomato tasting, farmers' market, vendor's booths, musical entertainment, 5K run and, of course, the crowning of the new Tomato Queen. The Tomato Festival was originally set up on Front Street.

The Friday night before the Tomato Festival, a Street Dance is held as the kick-off event. It is the night of the crowning of the Tomato Queen. Entertainment includes a live band, games and amusement rides for the kids, and food vendors. During the Street Dance, "BBQ and Blue Jeans" is sponsored by the Junior Auxiliary of Crystal Springs. They sell take-out containers filled with BBQ sandwiches, potato salad, baked beans and a dinner roll. This is the evening when other festival vendors start setting up their booths for the main day events. Vendors come from all over the U.S. to the festival every year to sell their wares, and provide games and amusement rides. A tomato museum at the Chautauqua Park Visitor's Center exhibits historical pictures, agricultural relics from the era, and examples of some of the shipping and canning labels.

Education
 Copiah Academy
 Copiah County School District

Communities

Cities
 Crystal Springs
 Hazlehurst (county seat)

Towns
 Georgetown
 Wesson

Village
 Beauregard

Unincorporated communities
 Carpenter
 Conn
 Dentville
 Gallman
 Glancy
 Hopewell
 Martinsville
 Midway
 Rockport
 Ruby
 Sand Hill

Ghost town
 Coars Springs

Politics

See also
 National Register of Historic Places listings in Copiah County, Mississippi

References

External links
 Copiah County Courthouse Pictures

 
Mississippi counties
Jackson metropolitan area, Mississippi
Mississippi placenames of Native American origin
1823 establishments in Mississippi
Populated places established in 1823
Black Belt (U.S. region)
Majority-minority counties in Mississippi